Écouché is a former commune in the Orne department in north-western France. On 1 January 2016, it was merged into the new commune of Écouché-les-Vallées.

The village
Écouché stands out today for the monumental church, a very rare Republican altar, several medieval merchants' houses, a number of original towers, a network of well-conserved lanes and – a reminder of the ordeal of World War II and the Liberation – a Sherman assault tank.

Until 2015, Écouché was the administrative centre of a canton within the arrondissement of Argentan.

History timeline

The origin of human settlement remains obscure. It can be supposed that the Gauls(Celts) and the Gallo-Romans recognised the advantages of the site, but the earliest written documents available that mention SCOCEI date only from 1066 (a grant of tithes from Gacé and Écouché by William the Conqueror to his wife Mathilda at the Ladies' Abbey (Abbaye aux Dames
) in Caen).

SCOCEI viendrait du mot SCOTTI, moines irlandais du 6è siècle (Jean-Michel Picart, Université de Dublin)

The place-name later evolved to Scocetum, Escocheum, Escochie, Escouche and finally Écouché.

Disputes have arisen over the origin of the name, but the more classical version is that it started with a man's name of SCOTTIUS followed by the Latin possessive suffix ACUS, meaning "the property of Scottius". This implies a Roman origin

 1045: the town had to meet the demands of the three sons of Guillaume Soreng, bandit chiefs who attacked the Diocese of Sées with fire and sword.
 1136: In the wars of succession between the heirs of William the Conqueror, the troops of Geoffroy invaded Normandy at Ecouché. The inhabitants fled, but not before burning their own village down. In this disaster the battlements disappeared, never to be rebuilt.
 Hundred Years War (1337–1453): In 1445, during the English occupation, a garrison of 16 mounted lancers and 48 archers was installed, matching what happened in the nearby fortified towns of Falaise and Argentan – which gives an idea of the importance of our town at that time.
 1450: When Normandy was reconquered by the French, it was in Ecouché that King Charles VII of France signed the confirmation of the letters patent of the University of Caen, which had been created by the King of England.
 Wars of Religion (1562–1598): Although, nearby Argentan was besieged, destruction spared Écouché, which found a way of managing the situation, favouring Catholicism.
 1589: the celebrated Henry Navarre IV, King of France, when waging war to bring Normandy under his sway, stayed in the ancient Hartshorn Inn situated North-East of the present Rue Pierre Trévin, where his room was kept intact until the mid-19th century. 
 French Revolution 1789–1799: The majority of the population joined the Revolutionary forces against the Royalist guerrillas (chouannerie).
 Napoleonic Wars 1803–1815: after Waterloo, several Prussian general staffs took over the mayor's house.
 World War I 1914–1918: The town lost 57 of her sons.
 World War II 1939–1945: Écouché became a centre of Resistance activities and the scene of intense fighting during the Falaise Pocket, completing the hard fought Battle of Normandy. 6 June 1944 was the first bombing with major civilian casualties.

Medieval fortifications

The description of Écouché as a CASTRUM found in 12th century charters is a form of language indicating a "ville bateice", meaning a town without walls, fortified only with palisades and featuring a wooden stronghold atop the feudal mound or motte (motte castrale, motte feudal).

The Écouché palissades, however, were reinforced with a belt of water, or moat, made up of the natural rivers and some ditches filled with water from the rivers. As an example, the Angevine ditch was 8 metres (26 ft)wide and 1.80 metres (6 ft)deep. Defences like this trench were only useful against minor assaults like roving bands of unemployed soldiers or brigands. But the town kept its moats for a long time. They were in a bad state at the beginning of the 16th century and the inhabitants secured permission from King François I to raise a tax on the retail sale of drinks in order to restore the moats, and extend them towards the Udon marshes.

In 1589 further work was carried out by the prisoners of the Duke of Montpensier.

Over the years sector after sector silted up and in the 17th century the moats around the mound were sold by their owner, the feudal lord, as a building site. More recently, others disappeared when the railway line became a two-way track in 1910.

The name of one street, the Rue des Fossés Meslet, keeps the memory of the moats in mind.

Entry to the town was by four gates provided with watch-towers:

 Bourges Gate, later Saint-Mathurin Gate, towards Argentan, near where the city hall or mairie is.
 Saint Nicholas Gate, towards Boucé and Carrouges
 Udon Gate, towards Brittany
 Falaise Gate, by the main bridge over the Orne river.

The mound at the centre of Écouché, although rendered useless by the fire of 1136, was a reminder of the feudal lord's authority. It was reduced in volume only at the beginning of the 19th century, after the Revolution, to allow some dwellings to be built near the church. What remains of the mound is now covered with private gardens.

The towers of Écouché
Originally, the stone towers (in Écouché usually hexagonal) were places of observation of the surrounding countryside and of defence at the town gates. There remain vestiges of the sentinels' places of rest and observation.

Ownership of a tower soon became a status symbol for the better-off, and in the 15th century new ones grew up in various places around the town; fifteen survive today. They were also useful as containing staircases between the various levels of the house. The tower-staircase thus became the backbone of the building, usually situated on the rear façade, that giving on to the street being reserved for trade. Inside the tube, the winding staircase, made of limestone, is of spiral form in which one end of each step fits into the outer wall, and the other end into a central column. It may turn to the right or the left at the choice of the builder. Such steps are usually constructed to turn in a clockwise direction going up, the right hand at the central column. Going down, the right hand goes against the wall. But in Écouché and the surrounding areas, most staircases built in the 15th century turn to the left – English style, as it is said. It is unknown if this was from the 30 years of English occupation during the Hundred Years War. A possible explanation of this originality is that it affords the defender better protection in the event of a last-stand fight inside the tower: in combat with the sword or even with the pistol, the defender is less exposed than the assailant.
The towers, or at least some of them, were linked by a network of tunnels which is today impassable, although legend has it that "a barrel filled with gold" lies within it.

Écouché before the Revolution

The Lords

With the exception of a few years in the 18th century, the feudal lords of Ecouché never made it their home. Alfred de Caix drew up a long list of the lords in his Histoire du bourg d'Écouché, most notable of whom were:
 Raoul de Gacé
 William the Conqueror, Duke of Normandy, King of England (1028–1089)
 Girard de Gournay, who took part in the Crusade of 1096

Thereafter, and for five centuries, the lordship was split into two branches:
 Hugues de Gournay, who shone at the siege of St.John of Acre in 1192
 King Philippe Auguste, of France (1165–1223)
 Henry FitzHugh, Chamberlain of the King of England during the English occupation
 King Henry of Navarre (1503–1559)
 the Harcourt family

Reunification of the lordship

 Gabriel II, Count de Montgomery, of an old Norman and English family, purchased one half of the lordship at auction on 13 May 1607 for the sum of 20,000 Pounds. He then inherited the other half from Girard de Gournay; Gabriel II was the son of the accidental murderer of King Henri II in a tournament in Paris in 1559
 Jean Baptiste Ango, who was the last of the lords. 

Écouché was a barony with responsibility for feudal judicial and administrative practices.

Justice

The lords made a show of their power by erecting three gibbets, but in practice exercised only lower judicial powers delegated to an executive sergeant of the Seneschal, a judge who dealt mainly with matters of tax collection and observance of customs.

For higher judicial matters, Écouché was attached to Exmes and later to Argentan. Until the Revolution, cases coming from the thirty-odd surrounding parishes were heard every fortnight in the courtroom above the Hall. Access to the court was by way of the storeys exteriors still in existence.

The Lords' Resources

They received:
 A duty on animals and merchandise in transit, for the maintenance of roads and pathways
 Taxes on the sale of drink in inns and property transfer duties (4 deniers per contract).

In addition, they had the right to appoint the langueyeurs, i.e.  those who checked that pigs were in good health prior to consumption.

The Lords' Properties

 The Manor House built in the 17th century beside the mill
 The covered market comprising 4 buildings
 The corn mills, together with mill races, fisheries, waters and rivers
 Meadows totalling about a dozen acres
 A four-acre field for crops
 Common marshlands near the Udon and the Cance, but without right of exploitation
 Walls, towers, ditches, bridges, the mound and other defensive structures.

Écouché, a city

Écouché was elevated to a city and thus released from feudal dues. The bourgeois was exempt from:
 Feudal rents
 Inheritance tax
 Personal services for the lords of the manor
 Maintenance of the mills
 Duties and excise in the markets.

However, the borough was obliged to undertake maintenance of the arches of the bridge, the town defence structures, the feudal mound and the sergeant's premises, as well as to remunerate the latter every year in the form of:

 One pair of "good and sufficient" shoes
 A small contribution on the occasion of marriages
 One sheaf of corn for each harvester
 Two deniers per year for policing the markets
 Two eggs at Easter and two deniers at Christmas for each family
 Fees for participating in rent collection.

Economic history
Markets: Every Tuesday and Friday the residents of the town, people from surrounding parishes and more or less regular peddlers descended on the Place d'Armes and the Place du Marché, while those who kept permanent shops under the porches of their houses in the Main Street served an increased number of customers. 

Purchases were made by barter or with hard cash. Deals were made orally for the most part and always ended with a glass in one of the numerous taverns in the town.

Commercial and festive activity was accentuated with annual fairs:
 Candlemas, 3 February (2 days)
 Ascension Friday (1 day)
 Angevine, 9 September (3 days), which existed already under Philippe le Bel (King, 1285–1314)
 Saint François, the Friday before 4 October (1 day)
 Sainte Catherine, the Friday before 25 November (1 day)

Commercial activity in Écouché was such that in the 16th century the value of the bushel in Argentan was changed to 16 pots so as to be the same as the Ecouché bushel.

The high degree of commercial activity is confirmed by the market halls consisting of four buildings, the large market, the small market, the grain market and the meat market. The Industrial Revolution of the 19th century halted this economic development: already in 1842 the textiles market closed and in 1922 the meat market was pulled down.

Sixty per cent of the old buildings have now been destroyed – a sign of the decline of the once intense commercial life. Of the great gatherings, only the Angevine and the weekly Friday market remain.

Saint Mathurin's Hospice: first Hôtel-Dieu, then a hospice, then a hospital, now a retirement home.

LIME quarry and ovens

The limestone plateau of Joué du Plain, on the Southern edge of Écouché, is rich in Jurassic deposits used for making mortar, and has been quarried for a very long time. It is known that the Romans used mortar as a building material, and spread it beneath the paving of their roadways. The same process is used today to protect motorways from frost. 

Five hundred years ago, lime was made by masons in small upright ovens situated either near the quarry or close to the building site, after transporting the limestone rocks and kindling there. Crushed limestone rocks and firewood were laid in alternate layers so as to facilitate calcination of the stones, and obtain an oxyde of calcium. The ovens were about ten metres high and, not resisting the heat, could be used only once. Some farmers used the same method at the beginning of the 20th century.

At the beginning of the 18th century permanent mortar ovens appeared in Ecouché, operated by professional owners. These ovoid ovens, without chimneys, were manually dug out of the rock in batteries of five or six ovens, beside the quarry. They were equipped with a mouth for loading, about 1.20 metres (4 ft)in diameter, and with another mouth for unloading of between 0.40 and 0.70 metres (1 ft 6 inches and 2 ft. 4 inches) in diameter. A statue of the Virgin Mary placed in a niche looked over each batch of ovens.

It became recognised during the 19th century that lime was also beneficial for restoring agricultural soils, and production of it was increased. In his almanach of 1842, L.J. Chrétien cites the case of Monsieur de Cénival, who more than doubled his crop production owing to liming.

The ovoid ovens were improved with the addition of chimneys, and later by the use of refractory bricks which extended their life to twenty years without need for rebuilding.

In 1930 a new plant was installed at La Répicherie, not far from the railway station – for now production was being transported to destinations further and further away. Each oven could produce 25 tons per day in continuous production, or 16 to 17 tons per effective working day of 10 hours. The limestone was quarried from a face of 200 metres and rocks were transported to the plant in aerial buckets suspended from cables 1,200 metres long, like those used in the mountains.

In 1961, during the full season from September to March, 60 workmen were employed in the plant. During the dead season some of them would be laid off, and the permanent ones work on organising the stock and outside construction jobs.

Later, the ovens were put back in the quarry. A drying system made it possible to process very fine and humid matter and to improve production (150 tons of mortar per day in 1966).

Economic and social history
Like everywhere else, many people worked in the fields. Cereal production mainly, but also cattle and pigs, kept day workers busy, hiring out their hands to this farmer or that, while their wives and children look after their own thin herds on the common wetlands. But Écouché also uses the surrounding waterways to develop industrial activities.

In 1723, some mills produced ratteen or Ecouché sheets, much valued. A factory producing large sheets in the fashion of Lisieux, bought mainly by merchants from Falaise who take them to Brittany, employed 150 workers in 1789; but only about 50 in 1809. In addition, local industry was producing kerchiefs and Siamese calico.

In 1819, Richard-Lenoir set up an establishment with 40 looms employing 63 workers producing 7 metres of quilting and 48 of bombazine per day. They also made sackcloth, called .

According to Chrétien, in 1842 they were producing four types of fabric: farmers' sheets and Cadiz sheets made from local wool were supplied to the cantons of Briouze and Putanges and the region around Domfront; sheets from wool and cotton striped in various colours, called Saint-Lô; and a coloured fabric on cotton thread, called African, which adorned the countrywomen of the cantons of Ecouché, Briouze, Carrouges, Mortrée, Argentan and Trun. Chrétien mentions a mechanical spinning-mill employing 40 men, 20 children and 5 spinsters, plus 3 tanneries and 2 tawers (leather-dressers). These products were offered for sale in Great Hall in the Market Place.

The people of Écouché are business-minded and their pugnacity, well known in the region, earned them some nicknames considered not very flattering. The rivalry between the bell towers led the people of Argentan to say:
"From Écouché comes neither fair wind (stench of tanneries) nor fair person (sharp-nosed in business)."

World War II

During World War II Écouché's buildings and homes suffered 15% heavy damage from aerial bombing and street fighting during the liberation. Most of the destruction followed the railroad tracks.

Local residence think of the war years as divided into three phases:

 La Drôle de guerre – 1 September 1939, to June 1940
 General mobilisation
 The Drôle de Guerre or "Phoney War"
 The exodus or "Exode"
 German occupation – June 1940 to August 1944
 Military control, requisitions, restrictions
 Local and national upheaval
 Problems of supply shortages
 Liberation – summer 1944
 Aerial bombing and the Allied Landing on D-Day, 6 June 1944
 Battles for Liberation – August 13–15, 1944

Population
Neighbouring communes suffered from the rural exodus and lost the majority of their inhabitants (e.g. Joué du Plain: 925 in 1806, down to 201 in 1975), thus sharing in the collapse of the population of the Department of the Orne as a whole (443,673 in 1836, down to 292,337 in 1999). But over the last 250 years Ecouché has broadly maintained its numbers at between 1200 and 1500.

Today the Commune has 1390 inhabitants (2005 census), of which 54.1% female and 45.9% male. Half of them own their own homes, 98.9% have running water, 82.2% own at least one vehicle; while 38.1% are in paid employment, 4.5% are seeking jobs and 31% live on retirement pensions.

Geography
At the heart of Lower Normandy, two hundred kilometers due west of Paris, Écouché nestles in a depression on the edge of the Paris Basin. The underlying ground stratum is of brioverien schist, which surfaces nearby at La Courbe and Mesnil-Glaise. In Écouché it is covered by vesulian limestone, in turn surmounted by relatively fertile soil deposits from the three rivers that provide the commune with water: the Orne to the north, the Cance to the east and the Udon to the south.

The extent of the commune, in spite of the addition in 1821 of the old commune of Méheudin, remains a modest . The built-up area extends beyond the Orne and the Udon Rivers into the communes of Sérans to the west, and Sevrai to the south.

See also
 Communes of the Orne department
 Château de la Motte, Joué du Plain

References

Former communes of Orne